Ali Jafari (is a serial entrepreneur who is well known for his research and entrepreneurship in the area of Information Technology (IT), more specifically, on development of a series of "Learning Management System(s)" (LMS). Dr. Jafari is currently working as a Professor of Computer and Information Technology at the Purdue School of Engineering and Technology and Director of the CyberLab at Indiana University-Purdue University Indianapolis (IUPUI). He continues to bring innovation and new perspectives to the smart learning environment industry to make teaching and learning easier and more powerful.

Ali  Jafari earned his BS in Business Administration from the University of Isfahan, Iran, before he moved to the United States to pursue a MS in Media Technology at the University of Wisconsin. He completed doctorate studies in Telecommunications/Mass Communication from Indiana University in Bloomington, Indiana. Since then, Jafari has envisioned, created and commercialized four major software systems, which are competing among a dozen internationally known LMS products such as Blackboard, Moodle, Desire2Learn, etc.  Jafari's projects included Indiana University's (1999) Oncourse (now Sakai), ANGEL Learning Management System (2000), Epsilen Environment, and CourseNetworking, LLC or theCN.com (2011).

In less than a decade ANGEL became an industry competitor and was acquired (May 2009) by Blackboard for $100 million. By forming a partnership and securing venture capital from The New York Times Company, Epsilen became one of the fastest growing IT companies headquartered in Indianapolis in 2008. His most recent company, CourseNetworking, LLC (The CN) began in 2011 with seed funding from Indiana University and Dr. Jafari. The CN (The CN) will combine learning management and social networking to form a new solution to teaching and learning. This will be done through academic networking that is free and open to the world. In this environment, learning becomes more social, engaging, interesting, global, open, and free (use of CN is free to end users and schools throughout the world).

Research and Interests
Recognized as a founding “Father of LMS”, Dr. Jafari has contributed his entrepreneurial savvy to three books, co-editing and authoring Handbook of Research on ePortfolios, Designing Portals and ''Course Management Systems for Learning: Beyond Accidental Pedagogy' He has presented papers and delivered keynote addresses in over a hundred national and international conferences. His research has been published in professional and scholarly journals ' on a variety of subjects in information technology. His research interests include user interface design, smart learning environments, distance learning, and intelligent agents both from conceptual and architectural perspectives, which guide the Professor’s passion for improving the integration of technology into teaching and learning.
Dr. Jafari desires to see the milestones of research go further than the acquisition of knowledge. In order to tackle real life problems, he feels, "It would be progress if higher education were to put a greater emphasis on commercialization of discoveries—perhaps even assigning commercialization the same level of importance as getting published and attracting grants”. In the future, he hopes to further develop products for commercialization to effectively exploit the uses and opportunities of modern technology in education.

Notes

Living people
American computer scientists
Iranian computer scientists
Year of birth missing (living people)